Cologne III is an electoral constituency (German: Wahlkreis) represented in the Bundestag. It elects one member via first-past-the-post voting. Under the current constituency numbering system, it is designated as constituency 95. It is located in western North Rhine-Westphalia, comprising the northwestern part of the city of Cologne.

Cologne II was created for the inaugural 1949 federal election. Since 2002, it has been represented by Rolf Mützenich of the Social Democratic Party (SPD).

Geography
Cologne III is located in western North Rhine-Westphalia. As of the 2021 federal election, it comprises the northwestern part of the independent city of Cologne, specifically the districts of Ehrenfeld, Nippes, and Chorweiler.

History
Cologne III was created in 1949. In the 1949 election, it was North Rhine-Westphalia constituency 9 in the numbering system. From 1953 through 1961, it was number 68. From 1965 through 1998, it was number 61. From 2002 through 2009, it was number 96. Since the 2013 election, it has been number 95.

Originally, the constituency comprised the area of Cologne on the right bank of the Rhine. In the 1965 through 1976 elections, it comprised the districts of Nippes, Niehl, Mengenich, Longerich, Chorweiler, and Worringen, as well as the area of Ehrenfeld north of Subbelrather Straße. It acquired its current borders in the 1980 election.

Members
The constituency was first represented by Johannes Albers of the Christian Democratic Union (CDU) from 1949 to 1957, followed by fellow CDU members Hans Katzer until 1965 and Aenne Brauksiepe until 1969. It was won by the Social Democratic Party (SPD) in 1969 and represented by Hubert Weber. He was succeeded in 1980 by Konrad Gilges, who served from then until 2002. Rolf Mützenich was elected in 2002 and re-elected in 2005, 2009, 2013, 2017, and 2021. Mützenich became leader of the SPD's Bundestag group in 2019.

Election results

2021 election

2017 election

2013 election

2009 election

References

Federal electoral districts in North Rhine-Westphalia
Politics of Cologne
Constituencies established in 1949
1949 establishments in West Germany